Cryobacterium levicorallinum is a psychrophilic and Gram-positive bacterium from the genus Cryobacterium which has been isolated from glacier ice from Xinjiang in China.

References

Microbacteriaceae
Bacteria described in 2013